Ken Murray (born  Kenneth Abner Doncourt, July 14, 1903 – October 12, 1988) was an American comedian, actor, radio and television personality and author.

Early life
Murray was born in New York City to a family of vaudeville performers.  Many sources incorrectly give his birth name as Don Court.  He had an older brother, Joseph. According to Murray's autobiography Life on a Pogo Stick, as a teenager he learned that Joseph was actually his father and the couple who he thought were his parents were in fact his grandparents. The family withheld the truth from Murray because Joseph, who was also a vaudevillian, did not want the public to know that he had a young son. Joseph had divorced Murray's mother and decided that his parents would provide a more stable life than he was able to as a traveling performer. Murray also wrote of his quest to find his mother in his later years.

Before embarking on a career in show business, Murray changed his name because he did not want to ride the coattails of his father's success; he wanted to make a name for himself.

Career

Vaudeville and stage
Murray got his start in show business on the stage in the 1920s as a stand-up comedian. He performed his comedy act on the vaudeville circuit and in burlesque.  He found success as a stage performer after appearing in Earl Carroll's Vanities on Broadway in 1935.

In the 1940s, Murray became famous for his Blackouts, a racy stage variety show featuring Marie Wilson (among others) at the El Capitan Theatre on Vine Street in Hollywood. The Blackouts played to standing-room-only audiences for 3,844 performances, ending in 1949. Later that year, the show moved to Broadway with Marie Windsor replacing Marie Wilson. It received devastating reviews (the revue was considered too ribald for more sophisticated New York audiences) and closed after six weeks.

Murray revived the Blackouts on the Las Vegas stage in 1956. The show was a hit and ran for three years.

Radio, films and television

After finding success on the vaudeville stage, Murray moved to Hollywood and made his film debut in the 1929 romantic drama Half Marriage, followed by a role in Leathernecking in 1930.

Murray was the host of a weekly radio variety show (The Ken Murray Show) on NBC 1932-33 and on CBS 1936–37.  He later was the original host (1945–57) of Queen for a Day, on the Mutual Broadcasting System radio show, which was simulcast on KTSL (now KCBS-TV), Channel 2 in Los Angeles.

During World War II, Murray was one of the many celebrities to volunteer at the Hollywood Canteen.

In 1947, he produced Bill and Coo, a feature film using trained birds and other animals as actors. Bill and Coo won a special Academy Award for "novel and entertaining use of the medium of motion picture" and "artistry and patience" .

He was also the host of The Ken Murray Show, a weekly music and comedy show on CBS Television that ran from 1950 to 1953. The show was the first to win a Freedom Foundation Award. Murray also guest starred on several television series, including The Ford Show, Starring Tennessee Ernie Ford and The Bing Crosby Show.

Murray produced and co-starred as "Smiling Billy Murray" in a 1953 film, The Marshal's Daughter, a western that featured his protégé Laurie Anders in the title role, her sole film performance.

In 1962, Murray portrayed the top hat wearing, cigar chewing, drunken Doc Willoughby in John Ford's The Man Who Shot Liberty Valance starring John Wayne and James Stewart, arguably his most memorable screen role. Paired off for most of the picture with Edmond O'Brien as an alcoholic newspaper editor, he drunkenly rolls over the gunshot corpse of villain Liberty Valance (Lee Marvin) with his boot, looks around off-handedly, and says "Dead" to the surrounding crowd of euphoric Mexicans.

Over the course of his career, Murray filmed Hollywood celebrities, using his 16mm home movie camera. He began filming the footage to send back home to his grandparents in lieu of writing letters. His grandmother saved the footage, which featured Hollywood stars including Douglas Fairbanks, Mary Pickford, Charlie Chaplin and Jean Harlow. Murray later assembled the footage in compilation films such as Hollywood Without Make-Up (1963). Footage filmed by Murray was used in several television specials, including Hollywood: My Home Town and the feature-length film Ken Murray's Shooting Stars.

In 1965, Murray played a THRUSH financier and owner of a Caribbean casino in The Man from U.N.C.L.E.

In 1966, Murray was cast as Melody Murphy in the Walt Disney film Follow Me, Boys! starring Fred MacMurray, Vera Miles and Kurt Russell.

Writing
Murray was also the author of a number of books, including his autobiography published in 1960, titled The Golden Days of San Simeon (1971), and the only complete life story in print of Broadway theatre impresario Earl Carroll, titled The Body Merchant (1976).

Personal life
Murray was married three times and had four children. He married vaudeville and burlesque performer Carlotta (Charlotte) La Rose in 1923. The couple appeared in vaudeville together and later divorced.  On July 4, 1941, Murray married model Cleatus Caldwell at the home of actor Lew Ayres in Hollywood. Edgar Bergen served as Murray's best man. The couple had two sons, Ken, Jr. (1942-1979) and Cort Riley (born 1944), before divorcing in September 1945.

Murray married his third wife, Betty Lou Walters, in December 1948. The couple had two daughters, Pam and Jane, and remained married until Murray's death on October 12, 1988 at Saint Joseph Medical Center in Burbank, California, aged 85. Murray has a star on the Hollywood Walk of Fame at 1724 Vine Street for his contribution to the radio industry. He was a Republican.

Selected filmography
Half Marriage (1929) - Charles Turner
Leathernecking (1930) - Frank
Ladies of the Jury (1932) - Spencer B. Dazy
Crooner (1932) - Peter Sturgis
Disgraced! (1933) - Jim McGuire
From Headquarters (1933) - Mac
You're a Sweetheart (1937) - Don King
Swing, Sister, Swing (1938) - Nap Sisler
A Night at Earl Carroll's (1940) - Barney Nelson
Swing It Soldier (1941) - Jerry Traynor
Juke Box Jenny (1942) - Malcolm Hammond
Bill and Coo (1948) - Ken Murray (Prologue)
Red Light (1949) - Himself
The Marshal's Daughter (1953) - 'Smiling Billy' Murray
The Man Who Shot Liberty Valance (1962) - Doc Willoughby
Son of Flubber (1963) - Mr. Hurley
Hollywood Without Make-Up (1963)
Hollywood, My Home Town (1965) - Himself
Follow Me, Boys! (1966) - Melody Murphy
The Power (1968) - Grover
Won Ton Ton, the Dog Who Saved Hollywood (1976) - Souvenir Salesman (final film role)
Ken Murray's Shooting Stars (1979, director)

Bibliography
Foolin' Around (1932)
Ken Murray's Blackouts of 1943 (1943)
Ken Murray's Blackouts of 1947 (1947)
Hellion's Hole/Feud in Piney Flats (1953)
Hellions' Hole (1953)
Ken Murray's Giant Joke Book (1954)
Life on a Pogo Stick: Autobiography of a Comedian (1960)
The Golden Days of San Simeon (1971)
The Body Merchant: The Story of Earl Carroll  (1976)

References

External links

1903 births
1988 deaths
20th-century American male actors
American autobiographers
20th-century American biographers
American burlesque performers
Film producers from New York (state)
American male film actors
American male musical theatre actors
American male radio actors
American male television actors
American radio personalities
American stand-up comedians
Television personalities from New York City
Television producers from New York City
Male actors from New York City
Vaudeville performers
20th-century American singers
20th-century American non-fiction writers
20th-century American businesspeople
Comedians from New York City
California Republicans
New York (state) Republicans
Comedians from California
20th-century American male writers
American male non-fiction writers
20th-century American comedians
20th-century American male singers